María Pilar Sánchez Alayeto (born 20 June 1984) is a Spanish former professional tennis player and a current professional padel player.

Career
She is the twin sister of María José Sánchez Alayeto, a former professional tennis player and current professional padel player. She won one doubles titles on the ITF Women's Circuit, and retired from professional tennis in 2003.

Since 2013, she has been a professional padel player. She has attained a world No. 1 ranking as of 2019, alongside her partner twin sister.

References

External links
 
 

1984 births
Living people
Spanish female tennis players
Female tennis players playing padel
Sportspeople from  Zaragoza
Twin sportspeople
Spanish twins